Golina   is a village in the administrative district of Gmina Stargard, within Stargard County, West Pomeranian Voivodeship, in north-western Poland.

The village has a population of 114.

See also
History of Pomerania

References

Golina